Parliamentary elections were held in the Czech Republic on 14 and 15 June 2002. The result was a victory for the Czech Social Democratic Party, which won 70 of the 200 seats. Voter turnout was 57.9%.

Campaign finances

Opinion polls

Results

References

Czech Republic
Legislative
Elections to the Chamber of Deputies of the Czech Republic
Czech